INS Beas (F37) is a  of the Indian Navy. She was built at the Garden Reach Shipbuilders and Engineers (GRSE), Kolkata.

She is fitted with an array of modern sensor suites and matching weapon systems. 

Beas is named for the River Beas. She is the second ship in the Indian Navy to bear the name. The first was a  commissioned in 1960 and scrapped in 1992.

Operations

Task Force Europe 2009
During May–July 2009, Beas was a part of the Indian Navy task force on deployment to Europe. During this deployment, the task force participated in joint-exercises with the Royal Navy and the French Navy. Exercise Konkan-09 with the Royal Navy, was conducted off the coast of the United Kingdom. Exercise Varuna 2009 with the French Navy was off the coast of France.

References

Brahmaputra-class frigates
Frigates of the Indian Navy
Ships built in India
2000 ships